The following lists events that happened during 1995 in South Africa.

Incumbents
 President: Nelson Mandela.
Deputy President: F.W. de Klerk along with Thabo Mbeki 
 Chief Justice: Michael Corbett.

Cabinet 
The Cabinet, together with the President and the Deputy President, forms part of the Executive.

National Assembly

Provincial Premiers 
 Eastern Cape Province: Raymond Mhlaba 
 Free State Province: Mosiuoa Lekota
 Gauteng Province: Tokyo Sexwale
 KwaZulu-Natal Province: Frank Mdlalose
 Limpopo Province: Ngoako Ramathlodi
 Mpumalanga Province: Mathews Phosa
 North West Province: Popo Molefe 
 Northern Cape Province: Manne Dipico
 Western Cape Province: Hernus Kriel

Events

January
 10 – General Johan van der Merwe, Police Commissioner of the South African Police Service, resigns and is succeeded by General George Fivaz.
 25 – South Africa and India sign a number of agreements relating to political, trade, economic, cultural, scientific and technical co-operation.

March
 27 – Winnie Mandela is dismissed as deputy minister of Arts, Culture, Science and Technology.
 Elizabeth II and The Duke of Edinburgh visit South Africa.

May

June
 6 – The Constitutional Court abolishes capital punishment in the case of S v Makwanyane and Another.

July
 19 – The Promotion of National Unity and Reconciliation Act, No. 34 is signed into law by president Nelson Mandela.
 South Africa and India sign an agreement on co-operation in science and technology.

August
 – Serial killer Moses Sithole is arrested for the murders of 38 people.

November
 29 – Desmond Tutu is appointed chairperson of the 17-member Truth and Reconciliation Commission (TRC) by president Nelson Mandela.

Births
 8 January – Kyle Edmund, South African-born British tennis player
 29 January – RG Snyman, rugby player
 14 March – Arno Greeff, actor
 19 April – Madrie Le Roux, tennis player
 5 May – Thomas du Toit, rugby player
 15 May – Bruce Bvuma, football player
 20 May – Warrick Gelant, rugby player
 25 May – Kagiso Rabada, cricketer
 5 June – Troye Sivan, South African-Australian actor and singer
 12 June – Claudia Cummins, artistic gymnast
 28 June – Demi-Leigh Nel-Peters, model, Miss Universe 2017
 21 July – Armand Joubert, singer-songwriter
 3 August – Ciara Charteris, South African-British actress
 5 August – Jean-Luc du Preez, rugby player
 5 August – Dan du Preez, rugby player
 6 August – Lynn Kiro, tennis player
 11 August – Brad Binder, motorcycle racer
 29 August – Ntando Duma, actress and television personality
 30 October – Anene Booysen, murder victim (d. 2013)
 7 November – Cameron Coetzer, badminton player
 20 December – Aimee van Rooyen, rhythmic gymnast

Deaths
 6 January – Joe Slovo, activist and politician. (b. 1926)
 20 June - Harry Gwala, activist and politician. (b. 1920)
 15 September – Harry Calder, cricketer. (b. 1901)

Sports

Rugby
 25 May to 24 June – South Africa hosts the 1995 Rugby World Cup and wins the final game 15–12 against the New Zealand All Blacks.

References

South Africa
Years in South Africa
History of South Africa